Ashfaq Hussain Zaidi, PP, (born 1 January 1951) is an Urdu poet and an author of more than 10 books of poetry and literary criticism.  He is considered at least by one commentator to be an expert on the life and works of Urdu poets Faiz Ahmed Faiz, Ahmad Faraz and also on Progressive Writers Movement.

Works

Authored
 Faiz Ek Jaiza (1977)
 Aitabar (1979)
 That Day Will Dawn (1985)
 Neendar Nal Rishta (1986)
 Hum Ajnabi Hain (1992)
 Faiz Habib e Amberdast (1992)
 Faiz ke Maghrabi Hawaley (1993)
 Faiz shakhsiat aur fun (2006)
 Ahmad Faraz: yadoon ka ek sunehra waraq (2008)
 Aashian Gum Karda (2009)
 Mein Gaya Waqt Nahin Hoon(2010)(Published in India)
 Sheeshoan Ka Masiha (2011)
 Deewar-e-Dabastan Par (2012)

His Urdu poetry has been translated in English and Punjabi.

References

External links 

 
 Urdu Conference Begins Today, Pakistan Press Foundation, 26 November 2008
 The Daily News Karachi, 27 March 2010
 Hussain hopeful for Urdu literature, The Daily News Karachi, 17 August 2010
 Glowing tributes paid to acclaimed poet, The News International, 9 April 2011
 Faiz Ahmed Faiz aur Ashfaq Hussain, BBC News Urdu, 12 January 2012

1951 births
Urdu-language poets from Pakistan
Living people
Poets from Karachi
St. Patrick's High School, Karachi alumni